refers to a planned city surrounding Chūō-ku, Osaka.

External links

Chūō-ku, Osaka
Geography of Osaka